Jason Pramas is an American photojournalist. He is executive editor and associate publisher of the alternative newsweekly DigBoston, and executive director of the Boston Institute for Nonprofit Journalism (BINJ) that he co-founded with Chris Faraone in 2015. 

In 2018, his column Apparent Horizon won first place in the Political Column category (circulation 40,000 & over) of the annual Association of Alternative Newsmedia Awards.  Pramas also founded Open Media Boston, an online metropolitan newsweekly serving the Boston, MA area, in 2008 and served as its editor/publisher until merging the publication with BINJ. 

He was formerly an assistant professor of communications at Lesley University, but has stated that he believes he lost his job in retaliation for helping lead a successful drive to organize Lesley core faculty into a labor union in 2015.  

A socialist, and longtime labor and community activist, Pramas was the lead organizer of the Boston Social Forum in 2004. He holds an MFA in Visual Arts from The Art Institute of Boston, and is noted for curating the 2014-2015 Boston Strong? art show that criticized the popular Boston Strong slogan.

References

External links

 DigBoston

American photojournalists
American male journalists
Living people
American writers of Greek descent
Artists from Boston
American socialists
Year of birth missing (living people)